William Englefield (6 October 1917 – 3 June 1988) was an Australian cricketer. He played four first-class matches for South Australia in 1946/47.

See also
 List of South Australian representative cricketers

References

External links
 

1917 births
1988 deaths
Australian cricketers
South Australia cricketers
Cricketers from Sydney